Dangibari  is a village development committee in Jhapa District in the Province No. 1 of south-eastern Nepal. At the time of the 1991 Nepal census it had a population of 7472.

It borders with Ghaliadubba, Charpane, Garamani, Chakchaki, Saranamati and Surunga VDCs. It is divided to 9 wards. 
The predominant caste is Brahman, Kshetri, Rajbanshi, limbu Santhal among others.
Basic infrastructural development is satisfactory here including school, roads, electricity, drinking water and irrigation.
A major fraction of alluvial fertile land of Jhapa lies here. 
Various notable figures in National politics and bureaucracy belongs to this place.
A major tourist and historical religious site Barhadashi (kuti danda) lies at 8th ward of this VDC.

References

Populated places in Jhapa District